The Northern Punjab cricket team was an Indian domestic cricket team representing the northern part of the Indian state of Punjab during the time of the British Raj and later the northern part of its Indian successor, following the partition of India.

The team first played first-class cricket in 1926 against a touring MCC team.  It next played first-class cricket in 1960, when the team made its Ranji Trophy debut against Jammu and Kashmir.  The team continued to appear in the Ranji Trophy until the 1967/68 season, when it played its final first-class match against Southern Punjab. In 1968–69 Southern Punjab and Northern Punjab combined to form an undivided Punjab team.

Notable players

See also
 Southern Punjab cricket team
 Patiala cricket team
 Eastern Punjab cricket team

References

External links
Northern Punjab cricket team at CricketArchive

Indian first-class cricket teams
Former senior cricket clubs of India
Cricket in Punjab, India
1903 establishments in British India
Cricket clubs established in 1903
1967 disestablishments in India